The University of Sydney Students' Representative Council (SRC) is the representative body for undergraduate students at the University of Sydney. In addition to a student-elected council and student advocacy portfolios, the SRC coordinates a free Legal Service and Caseworker service for all undergraduate students at the University of Sydney. These services provide legal, academic appeal, migration, tenancy and study advice to students. The SRC has a reputation as Australia's most radical student union, and has been instrumental in leading student activism on a range of issues including education, feminist justice, environmentalism, First Nations justice and queer rights. The longest-running weekly student newspaper in Australia, Honi Soit, is funded by the SRC.

Structure
The SRC is governed by the Council, which currently consists of 39 Representatives elected annually by undergraduate students. 1 Representative is elected for every 1000 undergraduate students at the University. The Council meets once a month. Motions can be presented by any student (within or without the council), and are debated on for political merit. Motions usually contain action points that can compel the SRC to commit to student issues, and advocate for student interest concerns.

The Executive of the SRC is elected annually by the Council, and consists of the President, Vice-President, General Secretary, and five general members, elected proportionally out of Council. Meeting weekly, the Executive makes most significant decisions regarding the SRC.

The day-to-day operation of the SRC is generally conducted by paid staff and paid office-bearers, being the President (directly elected by students), the Vice-President, the General Secretary, the Education Officer(s), and Women's Officer(s).

Annual elections are held in September each year, to elect the Council, the President, 7 NUS delegates, and the editors of Honi Soit, the student newspaper. Unlike most student organisations, other office-bearers are elected by the Council, and not directly by students. All undergraduate students have a right to vote in annual elections.

Approximately 4500 students vote each year.

History
In 1888 the establishment of the Sydney University Undergraduate Association marked the first sign of organised student government on the campus of Sydney University. The Women's Undergraduate Association was formed in 1899 and separate organisations for male and female evening students were to form some years later. In 1929 the four associations agreed to rationalize the governing of the student body, and the Students' Representative Council was established to represent all undergraduates. The first President of the S.R.C. was J. M. Gosper. The 1930/31 Annual Report acknowledges that it is 'largely to the enthusiasm and organising abilities of J. M. Gosper that the Council owes its origins.

Student government was initially concerned primarily with gaining a student voice within the official University hierarchy, and promoting student interests within the University environment. However, student leaders soon became aware of their influence within the wider community, and the scope of student politics extended to include issues of broader social and political significance. At various times student activism has been of considerable importance in moulding public opinion in Australia on issues as diverse as apartheid, the death penalty, censorship, conscription and tertiary fees.

Honi Soit is the SRC's official journal and was first published in 1929. Its longevity is perhaps unintended, as the SRC's Annual Report expressed 'doubt as to whether any useful purpose could be served by the continuation of Honi Soit''' and the publication was maintained the following year on an 'experimental basis.'

Past SRC Presidents
Past SRC Presidents
Prominent former Presidents of the Sydney SRC include a Prime Minister of Australia, Cabinet Ministers, and Members of Parliaments, State and Federal, Justices of the High Court of Australia and the Supreme Court, including a Chief Justice of New South Wales and a Court of Appeal President. Presidents of the SRC have also regularly proceeded to become Presidents of the National Union of Students.

Politics
From the mid-1960s the SRC has been at the centre of student activism in Australia. Most activist groupings in the National Union of Students have a presence at Sydney University, such as National Labor Students, Socialist Alternative, Student Unity (Labor Right), the Australian Greens, Grassroots Left and the Liberals.

Since 2000 the SRC has been heavily influenced by what is now National Labor Students (formerly the National Organisation of Labor Students), the student arm of Labor's Socialist Left. Prior to that, from the late 1980s until 1997, the SRC was controlled by the Left Alliance, a former NUS faction made up of a coalition of students to the left of Labor such as Socialists, the Australian Greens, anarchists, queer activists, and environmentalists. Labor Party affiliated factions dominated the SRC presidency from 1998 to 2014. In recent years Labor's hold on power was challenged by independent/non affiliated alliances, internal conflicts within established Labor factions and the emergence of the Grassroots Left. Grassroots Left quickly developed into a national NUS faction with a presence on several campuses. A member of Grassroots, Kyol Blakeney, was elected the second Indigenous president of the University's SRC in 2014. However, in 2015 and 2016, Labor Left faction National Labor Students re-secured the SRC Presidency, in cooperation with Grassroots in 2015 and in cooperation with moderate Liberals in 2016, who supported Edward McCann for the Vice-Presidency of the SRC. However, following the election this coalition collapsed, with a broad left grouping of Labor left, Socialist Alternative, independents and Grassroots elected to all remaining positions. In 2017, Grassroots returned to the presidency, electing Imogen Grant as the 90th President of the SRC. In 2018, an independent party of international students labelled the Panda Warriors won the presidency, electing Jacky He as the 91st President of the SRC. He is the first President to have been elected on primarily the votes of international students within the university. In 2019, Liam Donohoe won the Presidency, returning the SRC to a Grassroots president. In 2020, Swapnik Sanagavarapu was elected to the SRC Presidency unopposed, leading to a back-to-back Grassroots victory. In 2021, Lauren Lancaster narrowly won the Presidency in the largest election in USYD's history, maintaining the Grassroots Presidential hold.

The SRC's current President is Lia Perkins (Grassroots), having taken office uncontested on 1 December 2022.
See also
 University of Sydney Union
 Sydney University Postgraduate Representative Association
 Honi Soit''

Notes  
  Brett Mattes resigned late in his term, and was replaced by John McGrath, who had been elected in 1974 for the 1975 term.
  Peter Byrnes resigned midway through his term, and was replaced by Barbara Ramjan. Ramjan subsequently won election to the presidency in her own right.
 At the time of the 1978 SRC Annual Elections the SRC Electoral Regulations specified that the term of office commenced from the time of the official declaration of the poll by the Electoral Officer. There was a bitter dispute after the 1978 Annual Elections as the then Electoral Officer delayed declaration of poll for several weeks after the count had been concluded, resulting in the then President-elect, Tony Abbott, gaining access illicitly over a weekend to the SRC offices and declaring himself in power on the following Monday morning. Access to the SRC offices by Officers and representatives was barred by cohorts of Tony Abbott (from St. John's College) on that Monday morning and subsequent days and, eventually, the Registrar's office was called in to mediate between the contending sides. As a consequence of this in the following year the Electoral Regulations were amended to specify that the term of office commenced on 1 September.
  For the period to the end of 1988, Sydney University operated on the three-terms-a-year system and SRC Annual elections were held in Trinity (second) term in July. Subsequent to the University changing to the semester system in 1989, the SRC Electoral Regulations were changed during 1988 (to take effect from 1 Jan, 1989) to the effect that SRC Annual Elections be held in second semester and that the term of office of the Council be for one year from 1 December to 30 November the following year. Falling in a transition year, Rod McDonald held office for 15 months.
  Adair Durie was removed from office following the 1997 election.
 Luke Whitington was elected in the 1998 by-election following the removal of Adair Durie, and was elected again at the 1998 general election to serve in 1999.
  The Socialist Left merged into National Labor Students in 2006.
  David Pink resigned from National Labor Students on the 20 March 2013 joining the newly formed Sydney Labor Students.

References

External links
 SRC Website

Students' unions in Australia
University of Sydney